Winter X Games XIV were held from January 28 to January 31, 2010, in Aspen, Colorado. They were the 9th consecutive Winter X Games to be held in Aspen. The events were broadcast on ESPN.

Sports
The following were the events at Winter X Games 14.

Skiing
Snowboarding
Snowmobiling

Highlights
Winter X Games XIV took place just two weeks before the start of the 2010 Winter Olympics in Vancouver. Many of the events such as the snowboard cross, ski cross, and half pipe events acted as a prelude and set the tone for the Vancouver Olympics.

Kaya Turski of Canada landed the highest score in slopestyle history at the X Games winning gold.  In the same event, Sarah Burke tried to land a 1260 during her third and final run. Had she landed the 1260, this would have been the first time a woman had landed it during competition. Heath Frisby and Levi Lavallee, favourites in the snowmobile freestyle event, fail to qualify for the final, opening the door for Justin Hoyer, who went on to win the gold.

Sarah Burke failed in her attempt at a four-peat in the skier superpipe when she finished sixth, Jen Hudak won gold and 17-year-old phenom Megan Gunning won silver. Burke had predicted a year earlier that Gunning would be her biggest threat in an attempt to four-peat in the superpipe.

In the men's snowboard superpipe final, Shaun White won gold despite injuring himself 45 minutes prior to the final, in practice when he tried a 1080 inverted double cork. He did land two double corks back to back in the final and also added a double McTwist 1260 to seal off his gold medal run.

Nate Holland won his fifth consecutive gold medal in men's snowboard cross.  This was the first five-peat in the history of the Winter X Games. Lindsey Jacobellis also became the first person to win a double three-peat, when she won the women's snowboard cross for the third year in a row.  Her first three-peat was 2003–2005.

On the final day of competition, Ophélie David successfully completed the first four-peat in women's Winter X Games history, again winning the gold in skiercross. In the men's skiercross, the Canadians won a sweep of the medals, led by Chris Del Bosco. This was a first sweep of a Winter X Games medal round by a country other than the United States. With the men's sweep, along with Ashleigh McIvor and Kelsey Serwa's silver a bronze respectively, the Canadians won 5 out of 6 possible medals in ski cross.

Schedule

All times listed are Mountain Standard Time (MST).

Results

Medal Count

Skiing

Men's Slopestyle Results

Women's Slopestyle Results

Men's SuperPipe Results

Women's SuperPipe Results

Men's SuperPipe High Air Results

Men's Big Air Results

Men's Skier X Results

Women's Skier X Results

Men's Mono Skier X Results

Snowboarding

Men's SuperPipe Results

Women's SuperPipe Results

Men's Snowboard X Results

Women's Snowboard X Results

Men's Big Air Results

Men's Slopestyle Results

Women's Slopestyle  Results

Men's Snowmobile

Freestyle Results

Best Trick Results

Knock Out Results

This was a five-round contest in which the contestant with the shortest distance in each round was eliminated. The number listed represents the distance (in inches) of the best jump in given round.

Snocross Adaptive Results

References

External links
 ESPN.com Winter X Games XIV Page

Winter X Games
2010 in multi-sport events
2010 in American sports
Sports in Colorado
Pitkin County, Colorado
2010 in sports in Colorado
Winter multi-sport events in the United States
International sports competitions hosted by the United States
January 2010 sports events in the United States